If You Ain't Got a Weapon... is a double compilation CD by U.K Britrock band 3 Colours Red, covering their period with independent label Creation Records. The first disc features the band's singles plus two live tracks, while the second consists of B-sides. Both discs were compiled by frontman/bassist Pete Vuckovic. He also contributes handwritten sleevenotes. It was released on Sanctuary Records in 2005, alongside other compilations by Swervedriver and The Boo Radleys as part of their 'Creation Anthology'. The album title comes from the lyrics of one of their most successful songs, "Nuclear Holiday."

Track listing

Disc 1:  
 Paralyse
 This Is My Hollywood
 Pure
 Nuclear Holiday
 Beautiful Day
 Sixty Mile Smile
 This Is My Time
 Copper Girl
 This Is My Hollywood (London, 14.11.96)
 Hateslick (Newcastle 27.10.96)
 Pure (BBC session)
 Beautiful Day (BBC session)
 Paralyse (live)
 
Disc 2:  
 God Shaped Hole
 My Own Gauge
 Fake Apology
 If
 Zip The Morals
 Yellow Hair Carriage
 Human Factory
 On No-One's Side
 Throughbreeze
 Inside
 Til I'm Ready
 Everything
 Age of Madness
 Mental Blocks
 Pirouette
 Song on the Radio
 Nerve Gas
 Paranoid People
 Calling to the Outside
 Fit Boy And Faint Girl
 Sunny in England

References

2005 compilation albums
3 Colours Red albums
Sanctuary Records compilation albums